Absberg was a local noble family in Franconia.

History 
The family received its name from the village of Absberg, today located in the district Weißenburg-Gunzenhausen in Middle Franconia. Famous members of the family were Henry IV of Absberg, Bishop of Regensburg, and Thomas von Absberg, a robber baron who kidnapped important travellers such as royal legates or merchants from Nuremberg or Augsburg. To punish the behaviour of Thomas of Absberg the Swabian League destroyed the family's castle seat in 1523. This was documented in a woodcut by Hans Wandereisen. The family died out in 1647.

References 
 Reinhardt Schmalz: Der Fränkische Krieg 1523 und die Schuld der Sparnecker. In: Archiv für die Geschichte von Oberfranken. Band 85, 2005, S. 151–158. (German)

 
Absberg
Absberg, House of
Weißenburg-Gunzenhausen